Ali Gazi, Ali Gaji Dunamami ibn Zeinab, or Ali ibn Dunama, was a ruler of Bornu Empire from 1476 until 1503 or 1507.

Prior to his reign, the Sefuwa ruling house had split into two ruling branches. The result was palace intrigues and internal strife. He consolidated his reign by killing the candidate from a rival house and restricting opposition from challengers.

Ali Gazi later took on the Bulala nomads, who had driven out his people from Kanem during the decline of the Kanem Empire. He defeated them and re-captured the old Kanem capital, Njimi. He also founded a new capital at Birnin Gazargamu.

References

Rulers of the Bornu Empire